Stari Grad Žumberački is a naselje (settlement) in the municipality of Žumberak, Zagreb County, Croatia. According to the 2011 census, it has 2 inhabitants.

References 

Populated places in Zagreb County